From 1913 to 1917 only, West Virginia elected Howard Sutherland, one of its members of the United States House of Representatives, at-large from the entire state, in addition to its five districted representatives.

List of member representing the district

References

 Congressional Biographical Directory of the United States 1774–present

At-large
Former congressional districts of the United States
At-large United States congressional districts